Carlos de Borbón may refer to:

Charles III of Spain (1716–1788), King of Spain from 1759 to 1788
Charles IV of Spain (1748–1819), King of Spain from 14 December 1788 until his abdication on 19 March 1808
Infante Carlos, Count of Molina (1788–1855), Carlist pretender to the Spanish throne
Infante Carlos, Count of Montemolin(1818–1861), Carlist pretender to the Spanish throne
Carlos, Duke of Madrid (1848–1909), claimant to the Spanish and French throne
Alfonso Carlos of Bourbon, Duke of San Jaime (1849–1936), Carlist pretender to the Spanish throne
Prince Carlos of Bourbon-Two Sicilies (1870–1949), nephew of Francis II of Two Sicilies, father of Infante Alfonso, Duke of Calabria
Juan Carlos I of Spain (born 1938), King of Spain from 1975 to 2014